Ramūnas is a Lithuanian masculine given name. It is derived from the Lithuanian word ramus, meaning "calm". People with the name Ramūnas include:

Ramūnas Butautas (b. 1964), Lithuanian basketball player and coach
Ramūnas Navardauskas (b. 1988), Lithuanian professional road racing cyclist
Ramūnas Radavičius (b. 1981), Lithuanian footballer
Ramūnas Šiškauskas (b. 1978), Lithuanian basketball player 
Ramūnas Stonkus (b. 1970), Lithuanian footballer
Ramūnas Vyšniauskas (b. 1976), Lithuanian weightlifter

See also
Ramunė, Lithuanian female given name

References

Lithuanian masculine given names